Melvin Roy Lechthaler (April 1, 1908 – December 16, 1980) was an American football guard who played one season with the Philadelphia Eagles of the National Football League. He played college football at Lebanon Valley College and attended Mercersburg Academy in Mercersburg, Pennsylvania.

References

External links
Just Sports Stats

1908 births
1980 deaths
Players of American football from Pennsylvania
American football guards
Lebanon Valley Flying Dutchmen football players
Philadelphia Eagles players
People from Cumberland County, Pennsylvania